The Ebenezer Bible College and Seminary (Abbreviated E.B.C.S) is a Christian and Missionary Alliance Churches of the Philippines Bible institution  in Zamboanga City, Philippines. It's the first and the largest by area Bible institution of CAMACOP.

History
When C&MA missionaries arrived at Zamboanga City in the 1900s, they realized they need a Bible school to train Filipinos in the way of the Lord. Ebenezer was built upon a foundation of two Christian day schools known as the Ebenezer Schools.  The first school was for girls which was established by Rev. & Mrs. David Lund in 1911 and the school for boys was established in 1920. Then in 1926, the two schools were merged to form the Ebenezer Bible Institute with Rev. George Sthrom as its first principal.  When the Second World War arrived in the Philippines, the school temporarily suspended its classes. Classes were only resumed in 1946 by Rev. Herbert Jackson. For the first times in 1950, the Ebenezer Principal went to a Filipino, Rev. Vicente Pada. In June 1962, the Ebenezer School Board voted to rename the school as the Ebenezer Bible College. Principal Pada automatically became its first Director. In 1974, the name of the head of the College was changed to President. In 1984, Dr. Adynna Lim became the first woman head of the institution and served until 1993. After that, Dr. Joel Imbing Ortiz; Dr. Benjamin M. De Jesus and Dr. Joel A. Caperig became presidents of EBCS. Currently, Rev. Roland Don S. Dulaca is the President of EBCS.

Ebenezer Leaders

See also 
 Christian and Missionary Alliance Churches of the Philippines
 Ebenezer Bible College

References

External links 
 Official Website

Alliance World Fellowship seminaries and theological colleges
Seminaries and theological colleges in the Philippines
Universities and colleges in Zamboanga City